Ghodsi (literally "sacred", "sacramental"; transcription from the Persian script of the adjective form of Ghods/Quds, the corresponding transliteration from the Arabic script being Qudsi (lit.: Jerusalemite, someone whose family originated from Jerusalem) is a Persian surname.

Notable people with the surname include:

 Ali Ghodsi, Swedish-Iranian computer scientist
 Gholamreza Ghodsi (1925–1989), Iranian belletrist and poet
 Mohammad Ghodsi, Iranian computer scientist and electrical engineer

Persian-language surnames